Nene Claire King is an Australian journalist. She is the former editor of some of Australia's women's magazines, including Woman's Day, New Idea and Women's Weekly.

Early life
Nene Claire King was born in March 1943 in Melbourne to a Jewish family. Her parents were Lionel Louvain King (died 1996) and Emilie Rebecca Myers (1916–2008) and she has an older brother, Peter (Snowy). She was educated in Melbourne at the Methodist Ladies' College.

Career
King started in a publishing firm and was offered a role in front of the camera in a series of interviews. She froze on-screen, and it was decided that King would be better behind the scenes. After some work in Hong Kong, she came back to Australia and worked on The Sydney Morning Herald newspaper.

Working as chief reporter on the women's magazine New Idea awakened her love of magazines which eventually drew her into being the editor.

King is credited with turning the circulation of Woman's Day around. When she took the helm as editor, the magazine's circulation was 680,000 and within a short time, the circulation had boosted to over a million, outselling the top magazine, New Idea.

King eventually became the first female board member of Kerry Packer's company Publishing and Broadcasting Limited.

Addiction
On the edition of 12 June 2007 of Today Tonight on Australia's Channel 7, King revealed she is addicted to prescription medication and has recently been to rehab to cure addictions to illicit drugs.

Personal life
King has one sibling, her older brother, Peter.

Peter FitzSimons wrote King's biography Nene King in 2002. King wrote her autobiography, entitled Nene.

In February 2010, King claimed she was facing ruin after a disastrous falling out with associates was set to cost her more than $1 million. The matter went before Melbourne's County Court in February 2016. On 12 February 2016, an associate was found not guilty of defrauding King.

King has been married three times. In 1993, she married her third husband, Patrick Bowring, a rock journalist and diver. Bowring disappeared while wreck diving in May 1996, a month after King's father Lionel also died. Her mother Emily died in April 2008. King has admitted to using alcohol to "bury" her problems. She also admits to having smoked marijuana.

The former editor of Woman's Day and The Australian Women's Weekly magazines, told The Sunday Telegraph that she faced losing her home to pay her debts. She currently lives in Ballarat, Victoria, and writes a weekly agony aunt column for New Idea.

In June 2013, Australian actor Mandy McElhinney played King in the Australian Broadcasting Corporation television mini-series Paper Giants: Magazine Wars, a sequel to Paper Giants: The Birth of Cleo.

References

External links 
 
 

Living people
Australian magazine editors
Women magazine editors
Australian memoirists
Australian journalists
1943 births
People from Melbourne
Australian Jews
People educated at Methodist Ladies' College, Melbourne